Alejandro Díaz Liceága (born 27 January 1996) is a Mexican professional footballer who plays as a forward for Norwegian First Division club Sogndal.

Club career

América
Díaz was a fan of rivals Guadalajara. He played for an academy of Real Madrid based in Mexico and later moved to Club America's academy. A product of América's academy programme, Díaz made his debut for the club in Liga MX on 22 November 2014 as an 84th-minute substitute in a 2–1 loss to Atlas. On 8 April 2015, he scored his first goal for the club in CONCACAF Champions League in a 6–0 win over Costa Rican side Herediano. That season, he made a total of three league appearances, one appearance in the Copa MX and two appearances in Champions League. The following season, he made one league appearance and one appearance in Champions League.

Loan to Necaxa
On 8 June 2016, Díaz was loaned to Necaxa until the end of the season. He made twelve league appearances that season, one in the Liguilla Apertura and five in the Copa MX. His only goal for Necaxa came in a 5–1 Copa MX victory over Potros UAEM.

Return to América
Diaz returned to America for the 2017–2018 campaign, where he was finally promoted to América's first team on a regular basis. He made eighteen league appearances that season, four in the Liguilla Apertura, five in the Copa MX and two in Champions League, scoring a goal in the league and another in Champions League against Panamanian side Tauro.

Loan to Atlas
In the 2018–19 season, Díaz was loaned to Atlas, where he made eleven league appearances and two Copa MX appearances, but failed to score.

Loan to Zacatepec
On 5 August 2019, Díaz was loaned to Ascenso MX side Zacatepec. That season, he made three league appearances, three appearances in the Liguilla Apertura and three appearances in the Copa MX, but again failed to score.

Pacific FC
On 6 February 2020, Díaz signed with Canadian Premier League club Pacific FC. He made his debut on August 15 against the HFX Wanderers. He scored his first goal for the club on August 25, in a 2–0 victory over Valour FC. On July 21, 2021, Díaz scored his first hat-trick with Pacific FC in a 4–2 win over Atlético Ottawa. That season, he scored 10 goals and helped lead the club to their first ever league championship. After the title-winning 2021 season, it was rumoured that Díaz would depart the club, but he returned for 2022. His 2022 with Pacific was very successful, as he scored 13 goals in 18 league matches, factoring into the golden boot race. As league champions, Pacific also got to participate in the 2022 Concacaf League, and in the second leg their first ever continental matchup Díaz scored a hat trick against Waterhouse, helping to ensure Pacific advanced. When Díaz departed the club midseason, he was the leading scorer in the league, with 13.

Sogndal
On 10 August 2022, Díaz signed with Norwegian First Division side Sogndal for a club-record fee, the second-largest transfer fee in Canadian Premier League history.

International career

Youth
In 2013, Díaz played for the under-17 squad at the 2013 CONCACAF U-17 Championship, making five appearances and scoring one goal against Cuba as Mexico went on to win the tournament. At the 2013 FIFA U-17 World Cup he again featured heavily for Mexico, making seven appearances and scoring goals against Iraq and Italy on route to a finals run in which Mexico lost 3–0 to Nigeria national under-17 football team.

In 2015, Díaz represented the under-20 side at the 2015 CONCACAF U-20 Championship, making five appearances as Mexico went on to win the tournament. He scored four goals, the first two coming in a 9–1 victory over Cuba, the third in a 3–0 win over Honduras and the fourth in a 3–1 win over El Salvador. At the 2015 FIFA U-20 World Cup, Díaz made appearances against Mali and Serbia as Mexico were knocked out in the group stage.

In 2016, Díaz represented the under-23 team at the 2016 Toulon Tournament, making three appearances.

Career statistics

Honours
América
Liga MX: Apertura 2014
CONCACAF Champions League: 2014–15, 2015–16

Pacific FC
Canadian Premier League: 2021

Mexico Youth
CONCACAF U-17 Championship: 2013
FIFA U-17 World Cup runner-up: 2013
CONCACAF U-20 Championship: 2015

Individual
CONCACAF U-20 Championship Best XI: 2015

References

External links
 

1996 births
Living people
Association football forwards
Mexican footballers
Footballers from Mexico City
Mexican expatriate footballers
Expatriate soccer players in Canada
Mexican expatriate sportspeople in Canada
Expatriate footballers in Norway
Mexican expatriate sportspeople in Norway
Club América footballers
Club Necaxa footballers
Atlas F.C. footballers
Club Atlético Zacatepec players
Pacific FC players
Sogndal Fotball players
Liga MX players
Ascenso MX players
Canadian Premier League players
Mexico youth international footballers
Mexico under-20 international footballers
2015 CONCACAF U-20 Championship players